PLA Day also known as Army Day is a professional military holiday celebrated by the People's Liberation Army of the People's Republic of China on 1 August. It commemorates of the founding of the PLA during the 1927 Nanchang Uprising. Six years later, on 30 June 1933, the Communist Party of China's Central Committee for Military Revolutionary Cases voted to declare 1 August an annual holiday, being solidified later on 11 July by the government of the Chinese Soviet Republic.

Traditions
Every year, the PLA Honour Guard marches on Tiananmen Square for a traditional Flag Raising Ceremony. The Central Military Band of the People's Liberation Army often gives holiday performances. Army Day is a working day, although soldiers have a shortened work schedule. The General Secretary of the Chinese Communist Party holds an annual meeting at the Great Hall of the People in Beijing. Events are hosted by the military attaches of China in foreign embassies such as the Chinese Embassy in Russia or Cambodia. Ceremonial events between the Indian Armed Forces and the PLA on PLA Day are traditionally held at the Border Personnel Meeting point. The first instance of this was in 2015.

Military parades
Parades held on Army Day are not very common. In 2004, the first military parade held on PLA Day took place in Hong Kong to mark the PLA's 77th anniversary. The 3,000-strong parade saw the unprecedented attendance of anti-CPC lawmakers in the Legislative Council of Hong Kong at the parade. It began at 10:30 that morning with the performance of March of the Volunteers. The 2017 PLA Day Parade was a military parade held at Zhurihe Training Base in Inner Mongolia to celebrate the 90th anniversary of founding of the PLA. The parade was the first one to be held outside of Beijing since 1981, with 12,000 troops participating dressed up in combat garb instead of the usual Type 07 full dress uniform.

Legacy of 1 August
The August 1st aerobatic display team is named after the founding day of the PLA and inturn, the day marking PLA Day.
The Flag of the People's Liberation Army features the two Chinese characters "" as a reference to the anniversary day (literally meaning 8th month, 1st day).

References

See also
Public holidays in China

Armed Forces days
Military of the People's Republic of China
Public holidays in China